Phantom Blue is the self-titled first studio album by all-female heavy metal band Phantom Blue, released in 1989 through Shrapnel Records (United States) and Roadrunner Records (Europe and Japan). Guitarist Marty Friedman, at the time a member of the band Cacophony, and later of Megadeth, is credited as a co-producer. According to drummer Linda McDonald, the music video for "Why Call It Love?" was filmed within a maximum security prison in Carson City, Nevada.

Track listing

Personnel
Phantom Blue
Gigi Hangach – lead vocals, background vocals
Nicole Couch – guitar, background vocals
Michelle Meldrum – guitar, background vocals
Kim Nielsen – bass
Linda McDonald – drums

Additional musicians
Mike Mani, Dan Meblin – keyboards
Jennifer Hall – background vocals

Production
Steve Fontano – producer, engineer
Marty Friedman – producer
Peter Marrino – vocal arrangement (tracks 2, 5–7, 9), producer (tracks 2, 5–7, 9)
George Horn – mastering at Fantasy Studios, Berkeley, California
Joe Marquez, Marc Reyburn – production assistance

References

Phantom Blue albums
1989 debut albums
Shrapnel Records albums